Oleksiy Ivanovych Pecherov (born 8 December 1985) is a Ukrainian former professional basketball player. He was also a member of the Ukraine national basketball team.

Professional career
The Washington Wizards selected him with the 18th pick in the 2006 NBA draft; Pecherov signed a contract with the Wizards on 5 July 2007. Pecherov had previously played with Paris Basket Racing internationally.

On 23 June 2009 he was traded along with Etan Thomas, Darius Songaila, and a first round pick to the Minnesota Timberwolves for Randy Foye and Mike Miller.

On 16 August 2010 he signed with Olimpia Milano of the Italian league and the Euroleague for the 2010–11 season. On 23 August 2011 he signed a two-year deal with BC Azovmash of Ukraine.

On 9 November 2013 he signed a one-month deal with Valencia BC of the Spanish ACB League.

On 22 January 2014 he signed with Krasnye Krylia of Russia for the rest of the 2013–14 season. He left them on 6 May 2014.

On 4 February 2015 he signed with Kalev/Cramo of the Korvpalli Meistriliiga.

On 28 September 2015 Pecherov signed with the Denver Nuggets. However, he was later waived by the Nuggets on October 24 after appearing in one preseason game.

On 3 February 2016 he signed with Hekmeh of the Lebanese Basketball League.

NBA career statistics

Regular season 

|-
| align="left" | 
| align="left" | Washington
| 35 || 0 || 9.1 || .352 || .283 || .645 || 1.9 || .2 || .2 || .1 || 3.6
|-
| align="left" | 
| align="left" | Washington
| 32 || 0 || 8.7 || .386 || .326 || .828 || 2.4 || .1 || .2 || .1 || 3.6
|-
| align="left" | 
| align="left" | Minnesota
| 44 || 5 || 10.2 || .410 || .296 || .906 || 2.8 || .3 || .2 || .3 || 4.5
|-
| align="left" | Career
| align="left" | 
| 111 || 5 || 9.4 || .386 || .290 || .793 || 2.4 || .2 || .2 || .2 || 3.9

Playoffs 

|-
| align="left" | 2008
| align="left" | Washington
| 3 || 0 || 2.7 || .000 || .000 || 1.000 || .3 || .0 || .3 || .3 || .7
|-
| align="left" | Career
| align="left" | 
| 3 || 0 || 2.7 || .000 || .000 || 1.000 || .3 || .0 || .3 || .3 || .7

References

External links

Euroleague.net profile
NBA Draft.net profile
DraftExpress profile
FIBA.com profile

1985 births
Living people
BC Azovmash players
BC Kalev/Cramo players
BC Krasnye Krylia players
BC Kyiv players
Centers (basketball)
Liga ACB players
Minnesota Timberwolves players
National Basketball Association players from Ukraine
Olimpia Milano players
Paris Racing Basket players
Power forwards (basketball)
Sportspeople from Donetsk
Ukrainian expatriate basketball people in France
Ukrainian expatriate basketball people in Russia
Ukrainian expatriate basketball people in Spain
Ukrainian expatriate basketball people in the United States
Ukrainian expatriate sportspeople in Estonia
Ukrainian expatriate sportspeople in Italy
Ukrainian men's basketball players
Valencia Basket players
Washington Wizards draft picks
Washington Wizards players
Sagesse SC basketball players